Skin Chamber was a short-lived industrial metal band formed by Controlled Bleeding members Paul Lemos and Chris Moriarty as a side project. The band issued two studio albums, Wound (1991) and Trial (1993), before disbanding after the release of the latter.

History 
Lemos and Moriarty formed Skin Chamber after Controlled Bleeding entered a hiatus due to a dispute with the label Wax Trax! Records. Unlike Controlled Bleeding, Skin Chamber had a distinct guitar-based sound that was similar in tone to early Swans (cited by the band as their main influence), the music was also influenced by extreme metal and grindcore. Skin Chamber was not dissimilar to the band's other side projects, namely Fat Hacker and Joined at the Head.

Discography 
Studio albums
 Wound (1991; Roadracer)
 Trial (1993; Roadrunner)

References

External links 
Official website
Skin Chamber at Discogs.com
Paul Lemos interview about Skin Chamber

Musical groups from Boston
Musical groups established in 1991
Musical groups disestablished in 1993
American industrial metal musical groups
Noise musical groups
American experimental musical groups
American musical duos
1991 establishments in Massachusetts
Heavy metal duos